Macromolecules is a peer-reviewed scientific journal that has been published since 1968 by the American Chemical Society. Initially published bimonthly, it became monthly in 1983 and then, in 1990, biweekly. Macromolecules is abstracted and indexed in Scopus, EBSCOhost, PubMed, Web of Science, and SwetsWise. The editor-in-chief is Marc A. Hillmyer.
Its first editor was Dr. Field H. Winslow.

References

External links 
 

American Chemical Society academic journals
Bimonthly journals
English-language journals
Publications established in 1968
Polymer chemistry